Vangueria discolor is a species of flowering plant in the family Rubiaceae. It is found in Burundi, DR Congo, Tanzania, and Zambia. The epithet refers to the difference in colour between the upper and the lower part of the leaves, which is especially visible after drying.

External links
World Checklist of Rubiaceae

Flora of Burundi
Flora of the Democratic Republic of the Congo
Flora of Tanzania
Flora of Zambia
discolor
Taxa named by Émile Auguste Joseph De Wildeman